Fort St. Thomas may refer to:

St. Thomas Fort, a Portuguese fort in Tangasseri, Kerala, India
Fort St. Thomas, a Hospitaller tower in Marsaskala, Malta